Central McKenzie is an unorganized territory in McKenzie County, North Dakota, United States. The population was 717 at the 2010 census.

Geography
According to the United States Census Bureau, the unorganized territory has a total area of 417.38 square miles (1,081.01 km2), of which 416.10 square miles (1,077.69 km2) is land and 1.28 square miles (3.32 km2), or 0.31%, is water.

References

Unorganized territories in North Dakota
Populated places in McKenzie County, North Dakota